Dalbergia funera (the ebano or funera) is a species of legume in the family Fabaceae.
It is found in El Salvador and Guatemala.
It is threatened by habitat loss.

Sources
 

funera
Flora of El Salvador
Flora of Guatemala
Data deficient plants
Taxonomy articles created by Polbot
Taxobox binomials not recognized by IUCN